Game Tycoon is a business simulation game focused on production of video games. The game has been largely ridiculed, especially for some parts not translated from German to English.

Gameplay 
Game play is centered on the full production of video-game making; from production of an engine, concept design, physical design, packaging, licensing deals, market campaigns, and reviews.

The game starts off in 1982 with somewhat limited availability of features. Eventually, more options are made for engines and packaging, etc.

References 

2006 video games
Video games developed in Germany
Windows games
Windows-only games
Business simulation games
Tri Synergy games
Single-player video games